Owzkola (also Romanized as Owzkolā; also known as Bāghbān Kolā) is a village in Owzrud Rural District, Baladeh District, Nur County, Mazandaran Province, Iran. At the 2006 census, its population was 91, in 38 families.

References 

Populated places in Nur County